The day thou gavest, Lord, is ended is a Christian hymn written by the Anglican hymnodist the Rev John Ellerton (1826–1893) in 1870 for its inclusion in A Liturgy for Missionary Meetings.  It is often sung to the tune of St Clement and its theme focusses on the worldwide fellowship of the church and its continual offering of prayer and praise to God.

The hymn was selected to be sung as part of the celebrations for the Diamond Jubilee of Queen Victoria in 1897 and was also sung at the Hong Kong handover ceremony a century later.
It was also sung at the funeral of Queen Elizabeth II on 19th September 2022. 

The hymn has an enduring popularity, coming in third place in a BBC Songs of Praise poll of favourite hymns in 2005.

Two different translations of Ellerton's text are included in German official hymnals, the current Protestant hymnal  (EG) and the Catholic (Gotteslob, 2013, No. 96).

Music

References

External links
The Day Thou Gavest, Lord, Is Ended (arr. John Rutter), sung by the Choir of King's College, Cambridge

English Christian hymns
Catholic hymns in German
1870 songs
19th-century hymns